Tingri may refer to:

Tingri County, county in Tibet
Tingri (town), main town in Tingri County

See also
Tingry, France